Potisarn Pittayakorn is a coeducational school for grades 7 to 12 in Bangkok, Thailand.

History 
Founded by Nuan Thamutaro (นวล ธมมธโร) in 1956, Potisarn is built on Mr. and Mrs. Saiputhong's land in an area of 6 rai 440 square wah. When the school started in 1956, there was no classroom or any buildings. Students had to study in a temple. Later, Nuan Thamutaro raised funds for a school building. The result was a 2-floor wooden building that contained 12 classrooms. This building was finished in 1958. In 1982, Potisarn School got funded for a 3-floor concrete building that contained 18 classrooms. In 1983, the pool and toilet were built.  Later in 1984, the elementary education department selected Potisarn School into its elementary improvement program. In this program, Potisarn's students got free books, free uniforms and free shelter. In 1986, Suankularb Wittayalai recruited Potisarn to be their sub-school. That meant any Potisarn students who met the requirements would be eligible to get into Suankalarb Wittayalai without any further exam. Now the school consists of 3 main buildings, 1 medical building and 1 football field.

School Emblem 
The emblem of Potisarn Pittayakorn consists of three elements. The first element is Battlements (เสมา), which represents Thailand’s Ministry of Education. The second element is Trishula (ตรีศูล), which is the symbol of Department of General Education. And the last element is Bo Leaf (ใบโพธิ์), which represents the school of Potisarn Pittayakorn itself.

School Motto 
The motto of Potisarn Pittayakorn School comes from a famous proverb in Bali Sanskrit, which is written as “อตฺตา หิ อตฺตโน นาโถ”. This motto can be translated into Thai as “ตนเป็นที่พึ่งแห่งตน” and in English, it means “God helps those who help themselves”. This proverb has been teaching the students to do everything by themselves and make the most out of any resources they have got.

School Slogan 
There are three slogans every student has to bear in mind:

- The first slogan is “Study well and always be curious” (เรียนดี) This slogan is not only applied in their classes, but it also has to happen outside classroom.

- The next one is “Have a discipline, follow the traditions, culture and law of Thailand”  (มีน้ำใจ)

- The final slogan is “Have patience like an athlete does” (ใจนักกีฬา) as athletes understand what winning, losing and forgiving are. They never give up so that one day they can be successful.

School Colours 
The colours of Potisarn Pittayakorn includes blue and pink.

- Blue represents discipline and good behaviour.

- Pink is the representation of endeavour.

Available course 
Potisarn Pittayakorn School offer 3 courses for students: 1. E.P. (English Program) 2. I.P. (Intensive Program) 3. Standard Program.

1. E.P. is the course which is in the highest standard. Every subjects are taught in English (included religion and social studies) except history. and most of the teacher are foreigner. After student finished the course, they are expected to be able to speak fluent English. The tuition fee is 38,000 baht per semester.if it not included fee around 53,000 bath.

2. I.P. is the course which is the second-best course Potisarn has to offer. Most of the subjects are taught in English. And teachers are usually professors hired from top universities in Thailand. Students in I.P. usually have deeper knowledge in each subject than E.P. students but they would have a hard time to understand English. The tuition fee is 12,000 baht per semester.

3. Standard Program is the course that are planned according to Thailand’s Ministry of Education standard. All subjects except English are taught in Thai. Most of teachers are Thai. There are no tuition fees.

References

Schools in Thailand